Arnold Borisovich Dumashevski (28 December 1836 – 22 November 1887) was a Russian lawyer and writer.

Biography
Dumashevski was born in Mogilev, Russian Empire. He received his first instruction in the ḥeder, and as a boy helped his father in the tailoring and carriage trades. During this time he was left entirely to his own resources. By his exceptional abilities he attracted the attention of his instructors, who took a great interest in him.

After leaving the school Dumashevski found employment at the office of the Foreign Emigration Committee in Odessa. Here he was noticed by the Russian surgeon and philanthropist Pirogov, who helped him to enter the Richelieu Lyceum of that city; and there he studied law. Later he attended the University of St. Petersburg, graduating in 1862. Here again his abilities attracted the attention of the authorities, and he was sent abroad at the expense of the government to complete his law studies, a professorship being promised him on his return. After his return in 1865 a new law was passed prohibiting Jews from occupying professors' chairs of legal and of political science. He accepted a position in the Ministry of Education, and later he served in the Ministry of Justice, by which, for valuable services on the Committee for Reforming the Legislation of Poland, he was appointed first secretary of the third department of the Senate.

Work
Dumashevski was for many years one of the editors, and finally the owner, of the Sudebnyi Vyestnik ('Messenger of Judicial Affairs'), and was author of a number of articles and works on jurisprudence. His chief work is Sistematicheski Svod Ryesheni Kassatzionnavo Departamenta ('Systematic Collections of the Decisions of the Appeal Department of the Senate'). He also wrote "Nuzhen li Zhournal dlya Yevreyev i na Kakom Yazyke?" ('Do the Jews Need a Special Periodical, and in What Language?', in Russky Invalid, 1859), "Brak po Bibleiskomu i Talmudicheskomu Pravu" ('Marriage According to Biblical and Talmudic Law', in Biblioteka dlya Chteniya, 1861), and Yevrei Zemledyeltzy v Rossii ('Jewish Agriculturists in Russia', in Vyestnik Imper. Russkavo Geogr. Obshchestya).

Dumashevski advocated a practical tendency in the study of civil law, opposing the historico-philosophical side; and at the same time he was a partizan of the dogmatic development of Russian civil law. In his will he left 36,000 rubles to the University of St. Petersburg under the condition that this be entered as a gift "from the Jew Dumashevski."

References
 

1836 births
1887 deaths
19th-century lawyers from the Russian Empire
Jews from the Russian Empire
Legal scholars from the Russian Empire
Legal writers
People from Mogilev